The Carolinas PGA Championship is a golf tournament that is the section championship of the Carolinas section of the PGA of America. It has been played annually since 1923 at a variety of courses around both states.

Winners

2022 Jon Mayer
2021 Morgan Deneen
2020 Tommy Gibson
2019 Matt Vick
2018 Steve Scott
2017 Charles Frost
2016 Savio Nazareth
2015 Mike Townsend
2014 Jerry Haas
2013 Kelly Mitchum
2012 Kelly Mitchum
2011 Gus Ulrich
2010 Todd Camplin
2009 Jeff Peck
2008 Billy Anderson
2007 Curt Sanders
2006 Kelly Mitchum
2005 Larry George
2004 Kelly Mitchum
2003 Jeff Lankford
2002 Kelly Mitchum
2001 Jeff Lankford
2000 Tim Dunlavey
1999 Byran Sullivan
1998 Chip Sullivan
1997 Chris Tucker
1996 Rick Lewallen
1995 Tim Dunlavey
1994 Bob Boyd
1993 Bob Boyd
1992 Ron Cerrudo
1991 Chris Tucker
1990 Chris Tucker
1989 Bob Boyd
1988 Dale Fuller
1987 David Thore
1986 David Thore
1985 Leonard Thompson
1984 Bob Boyd
1983 Tim Collins
1982 Tim Collins
1981 Ronnie Parker
1980 Richard Lee
1979 Ronnie Smoak
1978 Bob Leaver
1977 Mike Schlueter
1976 Roger Watson
1975 Roger Watson
1974 Terry Wilcox
1973 O'Dell Massey
1972 Bob Bruno
1971 Bob Galloway
1970 Brad Anderson
1969 Buck Adams
1968 Hamp Auld
1967 Bobby Mitchell
1966 Jim Ferree
1965 Bob Spence
1964 Julius Boros
1963 Furman Hayes
1962 Davis Love Jr.
1961 Wayne Haley
1960 Avery Beck
1959 Mike Souchak
1958 Thorne Wood
1957 Furman Hayes
1956 Julius Boros
1955 Al Smith
1954 Johnny Palmer
1953 Al Smith
1952 Johnny Palmer
1951 Johnny Palmer
1950 Clayton Heafner
1949 Johnny Palmer
1948 Johnny Palmer
1947 Bobby Locke
1946 Dave Tinsley
1945 Orville White
1944 Purvis Ferree
1941–43 No tournament
1940 Charles Farlow
1930–39 No tournament
1929 Bill Goebell
1928 Marshall Crichton
1927 Ralph S. Miner
1926 Charles Reynolds
1925 Bill Goebel
1924 Frank Clark
1923 Ralph S. Miner

External links
PGA of America – Carolinas section
List of winners

Golf in North Carolina
Golf in South Carolina
PGA of America sectional tournaments